Daniela Todorova Todorova (born 18 October 1980, in Kazanlak) is a Paralympian athlete from Bulgaria competing mainly in category F54-56 javelin throw, discus throw and shot put events.

She competed in the 2008 Summer Paralympics in Beijing, China. There she won a bronze medal in the women's F54-56 javelin throw event.

External links
 

Paralympic athletes of Bulgaria
Athletes (track and field) at the 2008 Summer Paralympics
Athletes (track and field) at the 2016 Summer Paralympics
Paralympic bronze medalists for Bulgaria
Living people
Bulgarian female javelin throwers
Bulgarian female discus throwers
1980 births
Medalists at the 2008 Summer Paralympics
Paralympic medalists in athletics (track and field)
People from Kazanlak
Wheelchair discus throwers
Wheelchair javelin throwers
Paralympic discus throwers
Paralympic javelin throwers
Medalists at the World Para Athletics Championships
Medalists at the World Para Athletics European Championships
20th-century Bulgarian women
21st-century Bulgarian women